Donald Suxho (born February 21, 1976, in Korçë, Albania) is an Albanian-American professional volleyball player and a player for the US Olympic Team. As a setter, he participated in the 2004 Olympic games in Athens, Greece as well as the 2012 Olympic Games in London. Suxho and his family came to America in 1996 and lived in Natick, Massachusetts while searching for a college. He eventually chose to play for the University of Southern California and became one of the most well known volleyball players to come out of USC.

Playing career
Suxho's father Peter is the former coach of the Albanian Junior National team as well as the Natick High School boys and girls volleyball coach and it was under his tutelage in the US and Albania that Suxho learned the game. Suxho played for the Albanian junior national team from 1991 to 1996 and made the national team while still a teenager in 1995–96.

While at USC, Suxho was a four-year starter for a nationally ranked team. He set a number of Trojan records, including 164 career aces. He became one of the top players in school history and was a two-time All-American and AVCA National Player of the Year as a senior in 2000. Following graduation, he played professional beach volleyball in Poland and has been a member of the US Olympic Team since 2001. He competed in the Athens Olympics but missed Beijing due to injury. In 2012, he was one of 40 USC athletes to make an Olympic team.

In addition to his playing career, Suxho served as the USC assistant men's volleyball coach during the 2001–02 season.

In the summer of 2014, Suxho played with "Studenti" in Tirana Albania for a European Tournament.

Awards
 Suxho received a Sportsmanship award from Albanian Roots at the Albanian Roots Parade in the summer of 2013.

References

External links
 
 

1976 births
Living people
American men's volleyball players
American people of Albanian descent
Olympic volleyball players of the United States
Olympiacos S.C. players
USC Trojans men's volleyball players
Volleyball players at the 2004 Summer Olympics
Volleyball players at the 2012 Summer Olympics
Expatriate volleyball players in Poland
Volleyball players at the 2003 Pan American Games
Pan American Games competitors for the United States
Sportspeople from Korçë